The killing of Rabbi Meir Hai was an attack carried out by Palestinian Fatah militants on 24 December 2009 in the West Bank.

Background
Rabbi Meir Avshalom Hai (alt. Chai) was a 45-year-old Israeli Rabbi and father of seven who lived in the Israeli settlement of Shavei Shomron located in the northern West Bank, where had resided for 14 years before his murder. Hai was a Torah teacher and principal at the Shavei Shomron school. 

Hai was the son-in-law of the former Emanuel mayor Eliyahu Merav and was also a well-known member of the Bratslav Hassidic community.

The attack
On Thursday, 24 December 2009, at around 16:30 pm Hai drove his minivan out of the village of Einav and headed towards his home at Shavei Shomron.

While driving on Highway 57, a group of Palestinian militants driving a golf vehicle drove next to Hai's vehicle and opened fire at him, apparently with an automatic weapon. Hai was hit in the head from 10 bullets. As a result, Hai's vehicle swerved to the side of the road.  After the attack the attackers fled the scene and abandoned their vehicle near the village Asira ash-Shamaliya after they set the vehicle on fire in order to conceal any evidence connecting the perpetrators to the event.  A team of Magen David Adom paramedics was urged to the scene. They found Hai in his car, unconscious, bleeding massively, with no pulse and not breathing. After resuscitation efforts the paramedics team pronounced his death.

The attackers apparently fled through the point where the roadblock previously stood, to the village of Asira ash-Shamaliya.

The militants
The Imad Mughniyeh Group, a little-known affiliate of the Al Aqsa Martyrs' Brigades, the armed wing of Palestinian President Mahmoud Abbas' Fatah party, claimed responsibility for the attack. The group said its members "withdrew from the area safely." It also warned of "a series of attacks to come."

The three militants involved in the killing were: 
Raed Sarkaji, a Tanzim operative who was released in January 2009 from an Israeli prison after serving a seven-year sentence on terror charges;
Anan Subuh, an Al-Aqsa Martyrs' Brigades operative pardoned by Israel as part of a 2007 deal, under which 400 Fatah militants handed in their weapons, promised to cease their terror activity, and in return were assured that the IDF would stop pursuing them; and
Raghan Abu Sharah.

Initial statements
The Yesha Council stated that the murderous shooting attack in Samaria is a direct result of the policy of lifting restrictions on the Palestinians, removal of necessary road blocks in Judea and Samaria and the transfer of the responsibility for security to those whose ranks produced many terrorists who murdered Jews. As in the case of similar incidents in the past, once again the gestures aimed at [Palestinian President Mahmoud Abbas] Abu Mazen carry a price tag of Jewish blood.

Israeli Interior Minister Eli Yishai, Justice Minister Yaakov Neeman, and Members of Knesset Yaakov Katz and Uri Ariel attended Hai's funeral. Yishai stated that "Hundreds and thousands of children are crying over the loss of the rabbi," referring to the Jewish learning institutes Hai had set up.

Israeli Member of Knesset Michael Ben-Ari, from the far-right National Union party, said that "the path of capitulation, the opening of arteries, the [settlement] freeze and the release of [Palestinian] prisoners that [Prime Minister Benjamin] Netanyahu has brought down upon us signals to terrorists that Jewish blood is negligible. The terrorist probably thinks that he will be released in the next exchange."

Response

Israeli response
On 26 December, IDF Duvdevan Unit and Nahshon Battalion troops conducted an operation in separate locations in Nablus to locate three of the Fatah Al-Aqsa Martyrs' Brigades operatives who were determined by the Shin Bet to be behind the attack: Raghsan Abu Sharah, Raed a-Sarkaji and Anan Sabah. The fourth suspect reportedly turned himself in to Israeli authorities prior to the operation.

Short confrontations took place at the homes of Abu Sharah and a-Sarkaji. IDF forces used different methods including shots in the air in order to make the two surrender. Both refused, though Abu Sharah sent out his wife. In the third location, where Sabah was staying, a several-hour-long standoff included the firing of an antitank missile toward the house, in an attempt to force Sabah out. All three were shot dead by Israeli troops following their refusal to surrender.

An M16 rifle seized from Sabah was later identified by a police forensics lab as the weapon used in the attack. Sabah had been released from an Israeli prison as part of the amnesty deal with the Palestinian Authority in 2007, in which Israel agreed not to hunt down Palestinian gunmen who agreed to lay down their arms.

Major Peter Lerner, spokesman for Israel's Central Command stated that all three had been involved in anti-Israel violence in the past through activities in the Aksa Martyrs Brigades.

The following day, Israeli Prime Minister Benjamin Netanyahu stated at the start of the weekly cabinet meeting: I want to praise the Shin Bet and the IDF on the speedy operation against the cell which murdered Rabbi Meir Hai. Our policy against terrorism is clear. We will continue to respond aggressively – against any attack on Israeli citizens and against any firing of rockets or missiles at Israeli territory.

Palestinian Prime Minister Salam Fayyad condemned the Israeli operation as an "assassination" and "an attempt to target the state of security and stability that the Palestinian Authority has been able to achieve."

The Al-Aqsa Martyrs' Brigades threatened a quick response to the operation, stating: "This is a despicable ... We will not stand idly by and the holy warriors' blood will not be shed in vain. The enemy will see nothing but the language of blood and fire. It [the enemy] will pay for the crime … the response will be quick."

The shooting was cited in newspaper editorials demanding greater security for Israelis in the West Bank.

Palestinian Authority response
On 25 December, the Palestinian Authority stated that its security forces had rounded up, interrogated and released some 150 suspects in connection with the attack. According to an Israel Radio report, most of the suspects were residents of Tulkarem, and two of them were still being interrogated as of 25 December.

Sources in the IDF lauded the conduct of the Palestinian security establishment in its response to the killing of Hai, calling it "determined and impressive."

Fatah officials warned that the killing of its operatives could trigger a third intifada, which would be directed not against Israel but against the (Fatah-controlled) Palestinian Authority. During the funerals of the three men, thousands of Palestinians chanted slogans accusing the PA of collusion with Israel and calling for the dismantling of the PA. The funerals were described by a local journalist as "one of the biggest anti-Palestinian Authority demonstrations" in many years.

In addition, the Fatah named a soccer tournament in honor of the militants, called the "Martyrs Raed Al-Sarkaji, Anan Subh, Ghassan Abu Sharakh, and Haitham Al-Naana Ramadan Football Championship" as reported in the Palestinian newspaper Al-Hayat Al-Jadida.

See also
 Palestinian political violence
 Tapuah Junction stabbing (2010)

External links
 Murder of Rabbi Meir Avshalom Chai - published at the Israeli Ministry of Foreign Affairs
 Jewish settler shot by Palestinian in the West Bank - published on The Daily Telegraph on 24 December 2009
 Gunmen kill Israeli in West Bank shooting attack - published on The Seattle Times on 24 December 2009
 Israeli killed in West Bank shooting attack - published on Reuters on 24 December 2009
 Israeli settler killed in West Bank shooting - published on BBC News on 24 December 2009
 West Bank: Israeli Settler Killed - published on The New York Times on 24 December 2009

References

People of the Israeli–Palestinian conflict
2009 crimes in the Palestinian territories
Israeli murder victims
Drive-by shootings
Deaths by firearm in the West Bank
2009 murders in Asia